My Mum Tracy Beaker is a British children's television miniseries that premiered on CBBC and BBC iPlayer on 12 February 2021. The show was aired the week after The Dumping Ground's eighth series concluded. The series follows on from the events of its predecessors, The Story of Tracy Beaker, Tracy Beaker Returns and The Dumping Ground. My Mum Tracy Beaker saw Dani Harmer reprise her role as Tracy Beaker and included original cast members Lisa Coleman, Ruth Gemmell and Montanna Thompson, as well as new cast members Emma Maggie Davies and Jordan Duvigneau.

On 18 August 2021, CBBC announced that a second series based on the book's sequel would premiere in mid December. The Beaker Girls saw most of the main cast from My Mum Tracy Beaker reprise their roles along with newcomers Chi-Megan Ennis and Albie Parsons.

Cast

 Dani Harmer as Tracy Beaker
 Emma Maggie Davies as Jess Beaker
 Danielle Henry as Mary Oliver
 Noah Leacock as Tyrone
 Jordan Duvigneau as Sean Godfrey
 Lisa Coleman as Cam Lawson
 Christina Tam as Rosalie
 Montanna Thompson as Justine Littlewood
 Ruth Gemmell as Carly Beaker
 Jim English as Peter Ingham
 Neil Ashton as Fred

Development
The details regarding My Mum Tracy Beaker were announced on 3 August 2020, where it was announced that the series would be based on the 2018 book of the same name by Tracy's creator, Jacqueline Wilson, and it was confirmed that Harmer would be reprising the role of Tracy. Speaking about reprising the role of Tracy prior to filming, Harmer stated that she cannot wait to play her again, stating that she is a fan of the character herself, and she is interested to see where Tracy has ended up in life. She added that since she is a mother in real life, she knows the changes it causes to your life and personality, but confirmed that Tracy will still be the "same feisty, strong female lead that people know and love". It was later hinted that other original cast members from the franchise may reprise their roles in the series.

On 5 October 2020, it was confirmed by Harmer that filming had begun, and casting announcements were made. Emma Davies was cast as Tracy's daughter Jess, and it was confirmed that unlike previous Tracy Beaker series, the narration will not be told through the perspective of Tracy, instead being told by her 10 year old daughter, Jess. Jordan Duvigneau was cast as Tracy's "new, rich ex-footballer boyfriend" Sean Godfrey, and the returns of characters Cam Lawson, Carly Beaker and Justine Littlewood were announced, all portrayed by the original actresses. A trailer for the series premiered on 5 February 2021, and it was confirmed that the first series, consisting of three episodes, would air on CBBC and BBC iPlayer from 12 to 14 February 2021. My Mum Tracy Beaker continues to be broadcast regularly on the CBBC Channel from 2021.

Episodes

Ratings
On 15 February 2021, CBBC announced that the series was their most successful programme launch with 2.1 million streams on BBC iPlayer during the first three days of being made available. The first episode on 12 February attracted an average figure of 492,000 viewers aged four and above on CBBC itself. Seven-day ratings saw the figure rise to 883,000.

References

External links

 

2020s British children's television series
2020s British LGBT-related drama television series
2021 British television series debuts
2021 British television series endings
2020s British television miniseries
BBC children's television shows
Television series by BBC Studios
English-language television shows
Lesbian-related television shows
The Story of Tracy Beaker
Television series about children
Tracy Beaker series
Television shows set in London